Kenco is a British brand of instant, roast and ground coffee sold by JDE Peet's in the United Kingdom and Ireland. Originally known as the Kenya Coffee Company, they started distributing coffee to Britain in 1923. Shortly after, they opened a coffee shop in Sloane Square and then changed their name to Kenco in 1962.

In 2008, the brand was relaunched with 75% of the beans for its instant range being sourced from Rainforest Alliance certified farms. The company sources their coffee beans from Brazil, Costa Rica, Colombia, Peru, Ethiopia, Vietnam and Indonesia.

History
Kenco was founded in 1923 by a co-operative of retired White Kenyan coffee growers who traded as "The Kenya Coffee Company Limited". Soon, L.C. Gibbs and C.S. Baines began selling coffee from a shop in Vere Street, Mayfair. The shop sold roast and ground coffee locally but most of its sales were by mail order, selling coffee to country houses using advertisements in publications such as Tatler, Country Life and The Times.

As demand increased, the company moved to number 30 Sloane Street, London, next door to a food merchants called John Gardiner. Gardiner ran a food wholesale business, restaurants and provided outdoor catering at events such as the Wimbledon Tennis Championships.

After World War II, Tom Kelly, a Gardiner employee, persuaded the company to buy the Kenya Coffee Company. On completion of the deal, Kelly was put in charge of the new business and he expanded the retail chain. As well as selling coffee by mail order and from the Sloane Street premises, Kelly diversified into catering and opened eleven coffee shops in locations such as Wimbledon, King's Road and Golders Green. These Kenya Coffee Company shops may well have been the first branded high street coffee shops in the UK. In the 1960s, the cafés were thriving, selling not only coffee but all sorts of cakes as well. Besides the coffee shop activity, Kelly also acquired the rights to sell Gaggia machines, and so the company started to sell espresso machines to other coffee bars.

In 1962, the Kenyan Coffee Company changed its name into the Kenco Coffee Company, to reflect that the amount of coffee the company bought from Kenya was decreasing.

Before being owned by Jacobs Douwe Egberts, the brand was owned by Mondelēz International,  General Foods and before that Premier Foods.

References

External links

JDE Peet's
British brands
British companies established in 1923
Coffee brands
Food and drink companies of Kenya